Offsite construction refers to the manufacturing, planning, design, fabrication, and assembly of building elements at a location other than their final installed location to support the rapid speed of, and efficient construction of a permanent structure.  Such building elements may be prefabricated offsite in a different location and transported to the site or prefabricated on the construction site and then transported to their final location.  Offsite construction is characterized by an integrated planning and supply chain optimization strategy.  Offsite manufacturing (OSM), offsite production (OSP) and offsite fabrication (OSF) are used when referring primarily to the factory work proper.

Building configurations 
Off-site construction (like on-site construction) can be used for a variety of purposes including residential, educational, health care and commercial applications. Buildings can range from a few modular units to several hundred. They can be arranged in architectural configurations and can be many stories in height.

Similarities 
Off-site construction is very similar to modular construction, but it is focused primarily on permanent construction; modular construction can be either permanent or relocatable. Also known as offsite construction, or OSC, and also incorporates many MMC - or Modern Methods of Construction technologies.

See also
Prefabrication
Modular building
Modular classroom
Modular design
Modular home
Open source architecture
Prefabricated Home

References

External links 

 Design Innovation in Modular Construction
 Advanced Offsite Construction in Perth/Australia 

Building engineering
Sustainable building